Zoran Karać  (born 30 June 1995) is a Serbian professional footballer who plays as a winger for Mladost Novi Sad.

Honours
Kabel
 Serbian League Vojvodina: 2018–19

References

External links
 
 

Living people
1995 births
Serbian footballers
Association football midfielders 
FK Cement Beočin players 
FK ČSK Čelarevo players
FK Sloga Temerin players
FK Proleter Novi Sad players
FK Kabel players
Serbian First League players
Serbian SuperLiga players
Footballers from Novi Sad